La crise, is a 1992 French film written and directed by Coline Serreau.

Synopsis
Victor is a legal advisor who finds himself abandoned by his wife and fired the same day. He tries to seek comfort from different friends and family members, but everyone he meets is concerned with their own problems. His morale begins to falter when he realizes that no one cares about him. He meets Michou, a simple but clingy homeless man, who is the only person to listen to him.

Victor gradually realizes that his own egocentric attitude is responsible for the lack of consideration from those close to him, and he slowly adopts a different attitude. He hires Michou as his assistant, though the latter is less than competent. In the final scene, Victor finds his wife, who had wanted to get away from him for a while, and the film ends with doubts that their relationship will continue.

Through the successive dialogues between the different protagonists that Victor meets, the film addresses various themes such as modern medicine and the overconsumption of drugs, blended families, adultery, racism, junk food, and the fear of old age.

Cast

 Vincent Lindon as Victor Barelle
 Patrick Timsit as Michou
 Zabou Breitman as Isa Barelle
 Yves Robert as M. Barelle
 Annick Alane as Mamie
 Michèle Laroque as Martine
 Didier Flamand as Monsieur Laville
 Clotilde Mollet as Tania
 Laurent Gamelon as Didier
 Maria Pacôme as Madame Barelle
 Gilles Privat as Laurent
 Christian Benedetti as Paul
 Nanou Garcia as Sophie
 Robinson Stévenin as Borin's son

Awards and nominations

References

External links
 
 La Crise at Allmovie
 La Crise at Rotten Tomatoes

1992 films
1992 comedy films
French comedy films
Films directed by Coline Serreau
1990s French films